The 1991 Alaska Milkmen season was the sixth season of the franchise in the Philippine Basketball Association (PBA).

Draft picks

Notable dates
March 26: Alaska narrowly escape with a 100-99 squeaker over San Miguel Beermen for their second straight win and only their third victory in nine games as the Milkmen are in a must-win situation to stay in contention for a semifinals berth. 

June 18: The Milkmen nip Diet Sarsi, 97-96, on Frankie Lim's triple in the last three seconds for their third straight win in the All-Filipino Conference. 

June 25: Trailing by 13 points going into the fourth period, the Milkmen bounced back to deal the Tivoli Milkmasters their third straight setback, 99-94, as Alaska remains unbeaten with their 
fourth win in a row.

October 17: Alaska nip Swift, 108-106, for their seventh win in nine games as they dealt the Mighty Meaties their third straight setback.

First title
Sean Chambers was back anew for the Third Conference and "Mr.Excitement" Paul Alvarez was ready to play and rejoined his new teammates. The Milkmen were on top in Group B after the elimination round with seven wins and four losses. Alaska split their first four games in the semifinals and looks headed for another disappointing finish in search for their first championship as they were lagging behind Ginebra and Pepsi Hotshots in the standings, but just as quickly, the Milkmen bounced back with victories over Tivoli Milk and Ginebra San Miguel. 

On November 21, Alaska Milk sealed a championship showdown with Ginebra by defeating San Miguel Beermen, 94-80, in the last scheduled date of the semifinal round for their 12th win in 19 games. Alaska won their first-ever PBA title with a 3-1 series victory over Ginebra San Miguel in the best-of-five series.

Awards
Eugene Quilban was named the season's Rookie of the year.
Import Sean Chambers became the second recipient of the Mr.100% award.

Roster

Transactions

Trades

Additions

Subtractions
{| cellspacing="0"
| valign="top" |

References

Alaska Aces (PBA) seasons
Alaska